Conductor or conduction may refer to:

Music 
 Conductor (music), a person who leads a musical ensemble, such as an orchestra.
 Conductor (album), an album by indie rock band The Comas
 Conduction, a type of structured free improvisation in music notably practiced by Butch Morris

Mathematics 
 Conductor (ring theory), an ideal of a ring that measures how far it is from being integrally closed
 Conductor of an abelian variety, a description of its bad reduction
 Conductor of a Dirichlet character, the natural (smallest) modulus for a character
 Conductor (class field theory), a modulus describing the ramification in an abelian extension of local or global fields
 Artin conductor, an ideal or number associated to a representation of a Galois group of a local or global field
 Conductor of a numerical semigroup, the smallest integer in the semigroup such that all subsequent integers are likewise in the semigroup

Physics 
 Electrical conductor, an object, substance or material allowing the flow of an electric charge
 Electrical resistivity and conductivity, the movement of charged particles through an electrical conductor
 Electrical resistance and conductance
 Fast ion conductor, a solid-state electrical conductor which conducts due to the movement of ions
 Mixed conductor, a solid state electrical conductor which conducts due to the movement of ions and electrons
 Electrical conduction system of the heart
 Thermal conduction, the transfer of thermal energy through matter
 Thermal conductivity
 Optical conductor, such as Optical fiber

Transport 
 Bus conductor, a person who checks passengers' tickets on a bus 
 Conductor (rail), a captain of the crew of a train
 Conductor (underground railroad), an operative of the Underground Railroad of the antebellum-era United States which guided slaves to freedom
 Mr. Conductor, a character in Shining Time Station and in Thomas and the Magic Railroad

Other uses 
 Conductor (architecture), a traditional name for a downspout
 Conductor (company), a provider of SEO services platforms based in New York City
 Conductor (military appointment), a senior Warrant Officer appointment in the Royal Logistic Corps and its predecessors
 Conductor (software), a microservice orchestration system developed by Netflix
 The Conductor (film), a 2012 Russian film by Pavel Lungin
 Part of the palpal bulb of male spiders
 In biology, the conductor of a recessive gene or genetic carrier
 The Orchestra Conductor aka The Conductor, a 1980 Polish film by Andrzej Wajda
 A special education teacher who can applies the methods of conductive pedagogy